Mitchell Reece Clark (born 13 March 1999) is a professional footballer who plays as a defender for  club Accrington Stanley. He has represented Wales at youth level.

A graduate of the Academy at Aston Villa, he spent the 2018–19 season on loan at Port Vale. He joined Leicester City in July 2019 following his release from Aston Villa. He returned on loan to Port Vale for the second half of the 2019–20 season and first half of the 2020–21 season. He signed with Accrington Stanley in August 2021.

Club career

Aston Villa 
Clark graduated through the Academy at Aston Villa, having been scouted by the club playing for Bedworth Eagles juniors at the age of eight. He made his first-team debut for the "Villans" in the EFL Cup on 22 August 2017, starting the match at left-back in a 4–1 victory over Wigan Athletic at Villa Park. Manager Steve Bruce said that "he had a very good debut considering that he’s played out of position". He was a part of the under-23 squad that finished as runners-up of the Premier League 2 Division Two and won the Premier League Cup during the 2017–18 season. He signed a new contract in March 2018 to keep him at the club until 2019.

On 16 August 2018, Clark joined League Two club Port Vale on loan for the rest of the 2018–19 season. Manager Neil Aspin signed him to provide cover at full-back for James Gibbons and Cristian Montaño, after football adviser John Rudge had scouted him playing for the Aston Villa under-23 side. He made his English Football League two days later, starting at left-back for the "Valiants" in a 1–0 win over Crawley Town at Vale Park. He retained his first-team place as the "Valiants" went on a run of poor run of results, though Clark was noted as being one of their better performers. He made a costly mistake to give away a goal during the opening minute of a 2–0 defeat at Grimsby Town on 6 October, but recovered from his mistake and kept his place in the team. He remained a key first-team player under new manager John Askey and played a total of 45 games throughout the 2018–19 season, mainly at right-back, where he linked up well with right-sided midfielder David Worrall. On 3 May, upon returning from his loan spell, Clark was released by Aston Villa manager Dean Smith; his agent claimed there was interest from numerous clubs and said that "I believe that I can take him on to bigger and better things than what he's doing at Port Vale." He went on to change agents the following year, signing with Sports Management International.

Leicester City
On 26 July 2019, Clark signed a three-year deal with Premier League club Leicester City and was placed in Steve Beaglehole's under-23 squad. On 30 January 2020, Clark rejoined Port Vale on loan until the end of the 2019–20 season. He made an impressive second debut two days later, forcing an own goal with a dangerous cross in a 1–1 home draw with Salford City. However he received a straight red card for a reckless late challenge during a 3–2 win at Forest Green Rovers on 11 February. His second loan spell was ended on just four appearances as the league was ended early due to the COVID-19 pandemic in England.

Clark was nominated for the Professional Development League player of the month award for September 2020. On 9 October, he joined Port Vale for a third loan spell after James Gibbons picked up a long-term injury. He scored his first goal in professional football on 24 October, in a 2–1 win at Oldham Athletic. He made 12 appearances in the first half of the 2020–21 season, though did not feature in December due to "personal reasons" and Askey confirmed that Port Vale would not try to extend the loan deal. Clark had a trial with Blackpool in July 2021.

Accrington Stanley
On 26 August 2021, Clark signed a two-year deal with League One side Accrington Stanley. He scored Stanley's equalising goal in the 1–1 draw with Sunderland at the Crown Ground on 15 January. On 26 February, he was sent off in stoppage-time of a 3–2 home win over Wycombe Wanderers for a late challenge on Dominic Gape. Manager John Coleman said that it was "a debatable red card" and that "I feel for Mitch as he will miss three games and he has been our best player over the last couple of months". Clark made 27 appearances in the 2021–22 campaign as Accrington posted a 12th-place finish.

International career
Clark represented the Wales under-17 team and went on to be named as captain of the under-19 side by manager Paul Bodin.

Style of play
Clark is primarily a right-back, but is also able to play as a right-sided centre-back or at left-back. He is a pacey player with high energy levels who likes to get forward and attack.

Career statistics

Honours
Aston Villa Academy
Premier League 2 Division Two: 2017–18
Premier League Cup: 2017–18

References

1999 births
Living people
Sportspeople from Nuneaton
Footballers from Warwickshire
English footballers
Welsh footballers
Wales youth international footballers
Association football defenders
Aston Villa F.C. players
Port Vale F.C. players
Leicester City F.C. players
Accrington Stanley F.C. players
English Football League players